Bozdoğan is a village in Anamur district of Mersin Province, Turkey. It is at the east of Anamur and hosts the Mamure Castle. The population of the village is 1885  as of 2011.

References

Villages in Anamur District